The 2013 Longueuil municipal election took place on November 3, 2013, to elect a mayor and city councillors in Longueuil, Quebec, Canada. This is in conjunction with 2013 Quebec municipal elections that was held across the province on the same date.

Longueuil City Council voted to reduce the number of councillors from 26 to 15 in time for the 2013 municipal election.

Results

Mayor

Councillors

Greenfield Park

Saint-Hubert

Le Vieux-Longueuil

References

Longueuil
2013